Syerleena Abdul Rashid (born 31 August 1980) is a Malaysian politician who has served as the Member of Parliament (MP) for Bukit Bendera since November 2022 and Member of the Penang State Legislative Assembly (MLA) for Seri Delima since May 2018. She served as a Member of the Penang Island City Council from 2015 to 2018. She is a member of the Democratic Action Party (DAP). In addition to her involvement in politics, Syerleena was previously a columnist for The Malaysian Insider and contributed extensively in various online news portals. She was also formerly a member of Aliran, a local non-governmental organisation, as well as an anti-human trafficking movement.

Political career 
Syerleena joined the Democratic Action Party (DAP) in 2013, after being encouraged by her associate, Chris Lee Chun Kit. Both Syerleena and Chris were subsequently appointed as councillors of the Penang Island City Council, with Syerleena taking office in the local government in January 2015.

On 26 April 2018, prior to the Penang state election that year, Syerleena stepped down as a Councillor of the Penang Island City Council and was selected to contest the state constituency of Seri Delima. She faced a three cornered tussle for the constituency, and had to endure personal attacks and harassment by her opponents, especially Barisan Nasional (BN) far-rights from the United Malays National Organisation (UMNO). In spite of these, Syerleena prevailed in the election, winning by a margin of 13,211 votes.

Syerleena continued to face harassment by Muslim extremists after the election. In July 2018, she received a death threat accompanied by two slanderous messages, accusing her of wanting to weaken Islamic institutions and make Christianity the country's official religion.

DAP Penang 
Syerleena formally joined DAP in 2013 and is currently the Assistant Publicity Secretary for DAP Penang and a National Executive Committee Member for DAP Wanita (the national women’s wing of the party).

Syerleena is one of the DAP leaders being sued for defamation by UUM lecturer, Kamarul Zaman Yusoff for a statement she had written in 2017 “Save yourself first and leave the rest of the nation alone” which was published by several online news portals.

Awards and recognition

YSEALI 
In 2015, Syerleena was selected to participate in the Young Southeast Asian Leaders Initiative, also known as YSEALI a highly-competitive cultural exchange program for Southeast Asian emerging leaders sponsored by the U.S. Bureau of Education and Cultural Affairs under the U.S Department of State. Under the Fall of 2015 cohort, Professional Fellowship Program, she spent 4 weeks with the Des Moines City Council, Iowa.

ACYPL-US State Department Exchange Delegate 
Syerleena was selected as a delegate for the American Council of Young Political Leaders Exchange Program in collaboration with the United States government's State Department and observed election rallies of presidential candidates including that of Donald Trump, Hillary Clinton and Bernie Sanders as well as observed a caucus in Iowa.

Personal life 
In February 2021, Syerleena married Tom Osborn. She is the guitarist and song writer for a local rock band, Priwayat, which she formed with fellow DAP member, Zairil Khir Johari.

Education   
Syerleena was a Graphic Communication graduate from School of Arts, Universiti Sains Malaysia in Penang, but prior to that she had received her primary and secondary education from Convent Green Lane.

Election results

See also
 Seri Delima (state constituency)

References

Living people
People from Penang
Malaysian people of Malay descent
Malaysian Muslims
Democratic Action Party (Malaysia) politicians
Members of the Penang State Legislative Assembly
Women MLAs in Penang
Universiti Sains Malaysia alumni
21st-century Malaysian politicians
1980 births
21st-century Malaysian women politicians